M46 or M-46 most often refers to:
 M46 Patton, an American main battle tank
 Messier 46, an open star cluster in the constellation Puppis
 130 mm towed field gun M1954 (M-46), a Soviet artillery piece

M46 or M-46 may also refer to:

 Volvo M46 transmission, a Volvo M45 (Four-speed) with an electric overdrive added
 M-46 (Michigan highway), a state highway in Michigan
 the 46th known Mersenne prime
 M1946 Sieg automatic rifle
 Halcón M-1943, an Argentine submachine gun
 Madsen M/50, a Danish submachine gun
 M46 (Cape Town), a Metropolitan Route in Cape Town, South Africa
 M46 (Johannesburg), a Metropolitan Route in Johannesburg, South Africa
 M46 (Durban), a Metropolitan Route in Durban, South Africa